Taum Sauk Mountain State Park is a Missouri state park located in the St. Francois Mountains in the Ozarks. The park encompasses Taum Sauk Mountain, the highest point in the state. The Taum Sauk portion of the Ozark Trail connects the park with nearby Johnson's Shut-ins State Park and the Bell Mountain Wilderness Area, which together are part of a large wilderness area popular with hikers and backpackers.

In 2005, the Taum Sauk hydroelectric power plant was damaged and a billion gallons of water flooded parts of the park and other nearby areas.

Activities and amenities
The park has a rustic campground, a paved trail to the highpoint, picnic facilities, and a lookout tower providing a view the dense mountain forest obscures from other vantage points.

Mina Sauk Falls, the highest waterfall in Missouri, is reached via a rugged trail that makes a three-mile (5 km) loop from the highpoint parking area. The falls have cascading waters only during times of wet weather; at other times they are reduced to a trickle or less.

References

External links

Taum Sauk Mountain State Park Missouri Department of Natural Resources 
Taum Sauk Mountain State Park Map Missouri Department of Natural Resources

Protected areas of Iron County, Missouri
State parks of Missouri
State parks of the U.S. Interior Highlands
Protected areas established in 1991
Protected areas of Reynolds County, Missouri
1991 establishments in Missouri